Robert Emmet "Rabbit" McHale (February 7, 1870 – June 9, 1952) was an outfielder in Major League Baseball who played for the Washington Senators of the National League in 1898. His minor league career stretched from 1889 through 1909, mostly on the West Coast.

References

External links

1870 births
1952 deaths
19th-century baseball players
Major League Baseball outfielders
Washington Senators (1891–1899) players
Santa Clara Broncos baseball coaches
Sacramento Altas players
Sacramento Senators players
Oakland Colonels players
San Jose Dukes players
St. Joseph Saints players
Milwaukee Brewers (minor league) players
Milwaukee Creams players
Minneapolis Millers (baseball) players
Toronto Canucks players
Hamilton Hams players
Rochester Patriots players
Ottawa Wanderers players
Sacramento Gilt Edges players
Bristol Bell Makers players
Hartford Indians players
Rochester Bronchos players
Stockton Wasps players
Pueblo Indians players
San Francisco Wasps players
Colorado Springs Millionaires players
Denver Grizzlies (baseball) players
Sacramento Cordovas players
Sacramento Sacts players
Baseball players from Sacramento, California